Petri Juhani Keskitalo (born March 10, 1967 in Raahe, Northern Ostrobothnia) is a retired male decathlete from Finland. He was nicknamed "Pete" and "Elmo".

His best performance was fifth place (8318 points) at the 1991 World Championships in Athletics in Tokyo. Result was Finnish record at that time. He finished in eleventh place (8143 points) at the 1988 Summer Olympics in Seoul, South Korea. He also competed at the 1992 Summer Olympics in Barcelona, Spain, but did not finish the competition.

International competitions

References
 
 1988 Year List
 sports-reference

1967 births
Living people
People from Raahe
Finnish decathletes
Athletes (track and field) at the 1988 Summer Olympics
Athletes (track and field) at the 1992 Summer Olympics
Olympic athletes of Finland
World Athletics Championships athletes for Finland
World Athletics U20 Championships winners
Sportspeople from North Ostrobothnia